The Birth of Biopolitics is a part of a lecture series by French philosopher Michel Foucault at the Collège de France between 1978 and 1979 and published posthumously based on audio recordings. In it, Foucault develops further the notion of biopolitics introduced in a previous lecture series, Security, Territory, Population, by tracing the ways in which the eighteenth-century political economy marked the birth of a new governmental rationality. 

Foucault uses the term Governmentality and raising questions of Political science, political philosophy and social policy concerning the role and status of the State and neo-liberalism in twentieth century politics.

New rationality 

For Foucault, biopolitics is political power exercised on whole populations in every aspect of human life. Foucault discusses the basic definition of the practices of the neoliberal art of government. Foucault then tries to redefine the boundaries set by liberal thought on this matter. Foucault concentrates on the monetary aspect of government as a point of concern, frugal government, the art of maximum and a minimum and between the total opposite minimum and maximum.

Foucault looks at the early institutional practices of this method of frugal government, which starts from the early Middle Ages down to the early 16th and 17th centuries. The market appears from the early Middle Ages where the function of interest on money lending was strictly prohibited; one of the reasons being that the church was the main institution lending money at interest on church property where rental income was charged on church property a primary source of income for the church and it would have brought down the price of the church rental income if faced with rival competitors. Justification, according to Foucault, for the market was justice which was why the market existed in the first place. But, what was meant by justice? Foucault offers this explanation; it was a site of justice in the sense that the sale price fixed in the market was seen, both by theorist and in practice, as a just price, or at any rate a price that should be the just price, which meant to the theorists of the day a price that was to have a certain relationship with work performed, with the needs of the merchants, and of course, with the consumers needs and possibilities.

The next general theme Foucault introduces is the German Ordoliberalism, the Freiburg School which produced general problems among themselves, namely the state apparatus and its reconstruction after the Second World War. This general theme led to neo-liberalism heavy reliances on the law obviously, but it too, had to produce a new kind of consensus and a rearrangement consensus between the general populace; the working population, those engaged in production. This general or collective consensus produced 'economic partners' in this so-called 'economic game', such as; investors, employers, government officials, work force, and trade union officials. Foucault then offers some explanation on what was the reasoning behind this consensus between all these so-called different economic partners. According to Foucault this produced another kind of consensus, which was political power of the electoral community, not the political power of the right to vote, but the right of the political community to exchange seats, a rearrangement of the very relations of the so-called change of 'government' which gives and protects legitimacy. Which becomes political consensus, inasmuch as the 'economic partners 'accept the economic game of freedom. This is very much on neo-liberalism agenda, which according to Foucault was exactly the agenda that neo-liberalism required.

A strong Deutschmark, a satisfactory rate of economic growth, increased wages, an expanding purchasing power, and a favorable balance of payments which became a by product of the effects of good government. Foucault reads into this that in contemporary German which was in reality a founding consensus of the state. Foucault notices that this formation of a liberal type of governmentality had general shifts within this circle which can be traced back to the 18th century old or classical liberalism programmed by the Physiocrats, Turgot, and the other economists, for whom the problem was the exact opposite. The problem that neo-liberalism had to resolve was the following: given the existence of a legitimate state, which is fully functional under the police state with all its administration form of police state, how can this be limited within the existing state and, above all, allow for the necessary economic freedom within it.

For Foucault, this was the exact opposite because after the Second World War, the war machine that was unleashed was due to the fact that the system of economic rationality had broken down and the organisational network of world trade and its accompanied trade settlement system had completely become untenable, in which trust in the final payment settlement system had completely vanished, therefore initiating the military machine.

Policy of society 
Another theme Foucault concentrates on is the neo-liberalism conception of social effects, Gesellschaftspolitik, known in English, from the German, as the policy of society, this policy of society addresses the whole consensus of society. But this Gesellschaftspolitik had a two sided inconsistency, it had to produce the willing actors who take part in the economic process to accept the reality of their economic position and therefore their fate. The working population or labor force, the ones involved in production, madness, disease, medicine, delinquency, sexuality, but somehow, none of these faults/errors never existed before practices were involved and invented to become part of collective consciousness within practices. Foucault deals with this problem as necessary intrinsic operations of government which inextricably can produce regimes of truth (Foucault means regimes of truth as necessary social practices which become necessary objects of knowledge).

The ability to extrapolate a collective of co-ordinate errors becoming co-ordinated practices which become something that did not exist in the first place, but now becomes established systems of knowledge objects. The political regimes of truth (political power upon every aspect of human social life), the battle between legitimacy, submitting to a fabricated division between true and false. Foucault begins to try to trace back through time how this was at all possible, Foucault manages this task by reading into the set of practices interwoven into the policy of society, this was accomplished from the 16th until the 18th century where there was a whole set of practices of tax levies, customs, charges, manufacture regulations, regulations of grain prices, the protection and codification of market practices, etc.

This was well conceived by the exercise of sovereign rights, feudal rights, as the maintenance of customs, as effective procedure of enrichment for the financial administration of the general sovereign or the tax authorities, or as techniques for preventing urban revolt due to the discontent of this or that group of subjects. Foucault takes a look at these general practices through looking at the economic practices involved from the 18th century (where Mercantilism was at its peak) where a coherence strategy established an intelligible mechanism which provided a coherent link, together these different practices and their effects, and consequently allows one to judge all these practices as good or bad, not in terms of a law or moral principle, but in terms of propositions subject to the false dichotomy between true and false. Governments, Foucault noticed, were compelled to enter this competitive environment, by doing so entering into new regimes of truth with the fundamental effect of reconfiguring all the questions formally beset by the art of government.

Foucault turns his attention to ordoliberalism's view on social policy and how this can be woven into society's political power which differentiates from Adam Smith's liberalism two centuries earlier. This problem was faced head on by ordoliberalism; how can the overall exercise of political power be modeled on the principles of a market economy? To accomplish this the old version of classic liberalism had to be subjected to a whole series of modifications. The first set of transformations was the dissociation of the market economy from the political principle of laissez-faire, this uncoupling of the market and laissez-faire was replaced with, not abandon by a theory of pure competition which produced a formal structure and formal properties which could lay the fundamental principle of the coompetitivestructure that assured economic regulation through the price mechanism. This is a break from traditional liberalism principles. Founded by traditional liberals such as Walter Lippmann and expressed by many other traditional liberals such as Jacques Rueff, Wilhelm Röpke, Alexander Rüstow, Friedrich Hayek, Robert Marjolin, Ludwig von Mises, and their intermediaries and a non-economist, but however, was highly influential, according to Foucault Raymond Aron.

How would neo-liberalism define the new governmental action? Foucault traces three examples which neo-liberalism call a conformable economic action; firstly the question of monopolies which they claimed differed somewhat from classic liberalism. The classic conception of the economy as the monopoly seen as somehow semi-neutral, semi-necessary consequence of the competition in a capitalist system. The neo-liberal dream of competition cannot be left to develop without monopolistic phenomena appearing at the same time. This would eventually have the effect, of suppressing the operation of mechanism that facilitate, bring with them, and hopefully determine its eventual destiny. However, Foucault notices specific problems began to emerge for neo-liberalism, not only specific to neo-liberalism was how to incorporate civil society, political power; and Homo oeconomicus into a non-substitutable, irreducible atom of interest. Foucault makes the starting point of his investigations into this process from the 18th century where Homo oeconomicus has to be integrated into the system of which he is a part.

Civil society 
The concept Homo economicus had specific problems being interwoven into the new-found economic process of the 18th century. Foucault manages to trace this anomaly through the subject of right (known as consent of the governed the theory of right of that legal theorists of the 18th century tried to establish during their legal discourse) which did receive a great deal of attention because of what was perceived at the time of problems regarding the sovereign's power. The subject of right had to perform slight modifications because of the implication of him (the subject of right) limiting the sovereign's power. Which certainly differed from classical liberalism's conception of the sovereign power, which from the 16th century was conceived of as impenetrable to any rational discourse. The sovereign was conceived of as absolute, but the discovery of the people, subject of rights, homo oeconomicus, changed all that because of the arrival of market practices (the market system of capitalism) from the 18th century. Even the Physiocrats insisted that the market, the sovereign had to really respect the market.

How could this new problematic of liberalism, the sovereign, the market, and the new-found political power, homo oeconomicus which economic activity had at least specific patterns of correlation could be moulded into one tight unit? Foucault seeks the answer to this with a new field of reference, civil society. Foucault answers this question on the process of how to govern through governmental technology, the new neo-liberals, economic liberals sought to have a heterogeneity of the economic and the judicial which must be pegged to an economy understood as process of production and exchange. Civil society, according to Foucault's analysis, must place particular attention to its correlation of technology of government, the rational measure of which must be judicially pegged to an economy understood as the process of production and exchange.

What made this version of civil society tick? Foucault makes the amalgamation of civil society into society, which at the end of the 18th century became known as the nation (now known to us as the nation state). This became omnipresent, nothing was allowed to escape, which was to conform to the rules of right, and a government which nevertheless respects the specificity of the economy, will be a government that manages civil society, the nation, society, and the social. Foucault continues the theme on Homo oeconomicus which became part and parcel to this feature, Homo oeconomicus and civil society were two inseparable features and belonged to the same ensemble of the technology of liberal governmentality. For Foucault this was no mere coincidence, since the 19th century, civil society has always been referred to in political philosophy discourse as a fixed reality, which according to this theory, was outside of government or the state or state apparatuses or institutions. This omnipresent has many characteristics and one its main features are a primary and immediate reality which forms part of modern governmental technology.

Foucault views this governmental characteristic as simply the direct correlation of modern society's direct association with madness, disease, sexuality, criminal recidivism and criminal delinquency which he calls transactional realities. Although civil society, along with its associated governmental technologies haven't always existed they are nonetheless real, by real he simply means the power dynamic and their interplay with the rest of society in which all those involved, everything within it constantly eludes them. It is in Foucault's analysis where he makes four important points on this governmental modern technology of biopolitics; an absolute correlative to the form of governmental technology which liberalism associated itself with, and it is pegged, tied to the specificity of economic process.

How were all three incorporated into rational liberalism philosophical discourse? Foucault cites the well-known texts of Adam Ferguson: Essay on the History of Civil Society; from the 18th century to show how liberalism approached this problem from different angles and Adam Smith and his The Wealth of Nations which complement one another with regards civil society. First: there is a political and social correlate in terms of civil society. Second, civil society as principle of spontaneous synthesis; third, civil society as permanent matrix of political power; and fourth, civil society as the motor element that drives human history.

See also
Foucault's lectures at the Collège de France

References

External links
 Michel Foucault Audio Archive Home

Works by Michel Foucault
Biopolitics
Political philosophy
Political science